Giacomelli may refer to:

 15567 Giacomelli (2000 GF53), main-belt asteroid

People 
 Bruno Giacomelli (born 1952), Italian race car driver
 Cesare de' Giacomelli (died 1577), Roman Catholic prelate
 Geminiano Giacomelli (1692–1740), Italian composer
 Giacomo de' Giacomelli (fl. 1542–1552), Roman Catholic prelate
 Giorgio Giacomelli (1930–2017), Italian diplomat
 Guido Giacomelli (born 1980), Italian ski mountaineer
 Hector Giacomelli (1822–1904), French artist
 Mario Giacomelli (1925–2000), Italian photographer
 Nella Giacomelli (1873–1949), Italian anarchist
 Raffaele Giacomelli (1878–1956), Italian aeronautical engineer
 Stefano Giacomelli (born 1990), Italian footballer